Manassu is a 1973 Indian Malayalam film, directed by Hameed Kakkassery and produced by H. H. Abdulla Settu. The film stars Prem Nazir, Jayabharathi, Adoor Bhasi and Sankaradi in the lead roles. The film had musical score by M. S. Baburaj.

Cast

Prem Nazir
Jayabharathi
K. P. Ummer
Sudheer
Sujatha
Vincent
Adoor Bhasi
Sankaradi
T. R. Omana
Bahadoor
Bhagyalakshmi
Rajasree

Soundtrack
The music was composed by M. S. Baburaj and the lyrics were written by P. Bhaskaran.

References

External links
 

1973 films
1970s Malayalam-language films